John Laing is a New Zealand film and television director and producer.

Early life
Laing was born in Dunedin.

Career
Laiang made his major directorial debut with the film Beyond Reasonable Doubt (1980). He directed a number of other films including Abandoned (2015) before starting a career in television, directing episodes of the Canadian series The Hitchhiker. His other television credits include The Ray Bradbury Theater, Mysterious Island, Hercules: The Legendary Journeys, Xena: Warrior Princess, Jack of All Trades, Cleopatra 2525, Power Rangers S.P.D., Power Rangers Mystic Force, Orange Roughies, Nothing Trivial, Power Rangers Megaforce, Duggan and the television film Wendy Wu: Homecoming Warrior (2006) starring Brenda Song.

His 1992 film Absent Without Leave was entered into the 18th Moscow International Film Festival.

Filmography

Film

Television 
The numbers in directing credits refer to the number of episodes.

Producer only

References

External links

New Zealand expatriates in Canada
New Zealand film directors
New Zealand television directors
Living people
Mass media people from Dunedin
Year of birth missing (living people)